Arnold M. Brown (born March 5, 1931) is an American former politician. He served in the South Dakota House of Representatives from 1993 to 1996 and in the Senate from 1997 to 2004.

References

1931 births
Living people
People from Minnehaha County, South Dakota
Businesspeople from South Dakota
Republican Party members of the South Dakota House of Representatives
Republican Party South Dakota state senators